Pilosella praealta is a species of flowering plant belonging to the family Asteraceae.

Synonym:
 Pilosella praealta subsp. praealta

References

praealta